Count Peter John Joseph Czernin von und zu Chudenitz, otherwise known as The Honourable Peter Czernin, (born 1 January 1966) is a British-born film producer.

Early life and ancestry
Count Peter is the only son of Austro-Hungarian Count Joseph Czernin von und zu Chudenitz (9 August 1924 Prague, Czechoslovakia - 13 April 2015 Kensington, London) and Mary Hazel Caridwen Scott-Ellis, 10th Baroness Howard de Walden (born 12 August 1935). He is the heir apparent to the English peerage title of Baron Howard de Walden, which was created in 1597 by Queen Elizabeth I for Admiral Lord Thomas Howard, a younger son of Thomas Howard, 4th Duke of Norfolk.

Personal life
He married on 17 September 1994, in Cambridge, Lucinda Suzanne Wright (born 1965). They have one daughter and one son:
 Audrey Serena Angela (born 1997)
 Alexander John Peter (born 1999)

Professional work
He is the co-founder of production company Blueprint Pictures with Graham Broadbent.

As a producer, his work includes In Bruges (2008), The Best Exotic Marigold Hotel (2011), Seven Psychopaths (2012) and Three Billboards Outside Ebbing, Missouri (2017), a critically acclaimed film for which he was co-nominated for the Academy Award for Best Picture at the 90th Academy Awards.

Filmography

 2022: The Banshees of Inisherin (producer)
 2022: Lady Chatterley's Lover (producer)
 2021: A Boy Called Christmas (producer)
 2021: The Last Letter from Your Lover (producer)
 2020: Emma. (producer)
 2018: The Guernsey Literary and Potato Peel Pie Society (producer) (post-production)
 2018: A Very English Scandal (TV Movie) (executive producer) (post-production) 
 2018: The Mercy (producer) 
 2017: Three Billboards Outside Ebbing, Missouri (producer - produced by) 
 2016: The Last Dragonslayer (TV Movie) (executive producer) 
 2015: The Outcast (TV Mini-Series) (producer - 2 episodes) 
 2015: The Second Best Exotic Marigold Hotel (producer - as Pete Czernin) 
 2014: The Riot Club (producer) 
 2012: Seven Psychopaths (producer) 
 2012: Now Is Good (producer - as Pete Czernin) 
 2011: The Best Exotic Marigold Hotel (producer - as Pete Czernin) 
 2008: In Bruges (producer - as Pete Czernin, produced by) 
 2007: Wind Chill (producer) 
 2005: Piccadilly Jim (producer) 
 2004: Gladiatress (co-producer) 
 2001: Happy Campers (associate producer - as Pete Czernin)

References

External links
 Peter Czernin at Biography 
 

Peter
1966 births
Living people
British film producers
Filmmakers who won the Best Film BAFTA Award
Golden Globe Award-winning producers